Jennifer Ann McIntyre (born October 31, 1976) is an American college softball coach, and is the former head coach of the Connecticut Huskies softball team.

Playing career
Born in Richmond, Virginia, McIntyre graduated from Midlothian High School in Midlothian, Virginia. McIntyre played at Penn State from 1995 to 1998, where she was the starting third baseman for all four years.  She was team MVP as a junior, and a captain in her senior year.  She was named a 1997 Academic All-American, and was a three time Academic All-Big Ten selection.  McIntyre is sixth all-time in stolen bases.

Coaching career
In 2000, McIntyre became an assistant at Indiana, where she remained for two seasons.  She then returned to her alma mater, Penn State for 12 seasons, rising to the position of associate head coach, and helping the Nittany Lions to 6 NCAA Division I softball championship appearances.  Next, McIntyre served as associate head coach at Boston University for only one season.  In that season, the Terriers won the Patriot League softball tournament and recorded a win in the NCAA tournament against Louisville. On July 7, 2014, she was named head coach at Connecticut, succeeding legendary coach Karen Mullins.  In her first season, the Huskies finished 18–35.

Head coaching record

References

1976 births
Living people
Female sports coaches
American softball coaches
Ohio State Buckeyes softball coaches
Boston University Terriers softball coaches
UConn Huskies softball coaches
Indiana Hoosiers softball coaches
Penn State Nittany Lions softball coaches
Penn State Nittany Lions softball players
People from Midlothian, Virginia
Sportspeople from Richmond, Virginia
Softball players from Virginia